, is a stony Florian asteroid from the inner regions of the asteroid belt, approximately 3.7 kilometers in diameter. It was discovered on 22 August 1969, by Czech astronomer Luboš Kohoutek at Bergedorf Observatory in Hamburg, Germany.

Description 

The S-type asteroid is a member of the Flora family, one of the largest groups of stony asteroids in the main-belt. It orbits the Sun at a distance of 1.9–2.5 AU once every 3 years and 4 months (1,212 days). Its orbit has an eccentricity of 0.14 and an inclination of 7° with respect to the ecliptic. As no precoveries were taken, the asteroid's observation arc starts with its discovery observation in 1969.

A rotational lightcurve for this asteroid was published by several Hungarian astronomers in August 2005. The photometric observations gave a rotation period of  hours with a brightness variation of 0.27 magnitude.

The Collaborative Asteroid Lightcurve Link assumes an albedo of 0.24 – derived from 8 Flora, the largest member and namesake of its orbital family – and calculates a diameter of 3.7 kilometers.

Numbering and naming 

This minor planet was numbered by the Minor Planet Center on 28 September 1999. As of 2018, it has not been named.

References

External links 
 Asteroid Lightcurve Database (LCDB), query form (info )
 Dictionary of Minor Planet Names, Google books
 Asteroids and comets rotation curves, CdR – Observatoire de Genève, Raoul Behrend
 Discovery Circumstances: Numbered Minor Planets (10001)-(15000) – Minor Planet Center
 
 

011436
Discoveries by Luboš Kohoutek
19690822